Troesmis was an ancient Roman legionary fortress, a major site situated on the Danube and forming a key part of the Limes Moesiae frontier system. Around this fortress the Geto-Dacian town later developed. It was situated in what is now Romania near Igliţa-Turcoaia.
Between 107 and 161, it was the home of the Roman Legio V Macedonica. Notitia Dignitatum shows that during 337–361, it was the headquarters of Legio II Herculia.

Destruction of the site
The site was concessioned to Desire More by the Ottoman Empire for farming activities. In 1882 Desire More started excavations, and the stones from the ancient site were sold as construction materials in Galați and Brăila. Suspected by the local Muslim villagers that the scope of the excavation is a treasure hunt, a local revolt started. With the help of Engelhardt, the French representative in Danube Commission, armed intervention stop the revolt. 24 epigraphic inscriptions were sent to France. Four of the inscriptions were published by Theodore Mommsen in 1864.

Research
From 1861 to 1867, the French government sent a team of archeologists led by Boissiere and Ernest Desjardins to Troesmis. The French team discovered 55 Latin inscriptions referring to the history of Troesmis, Legio V Macedonica and Legio I Italica.
The research was continued by Gr. G Tocilescu, who destroyed ancient site walls in order to find and save the inscriptions.

Historical accounts
The Roman poet Ovid provides some of the first documentary evidence of the ancient Dacian town of Troesmis as conquered by Pomponius Flaccus from the Getae and given to the Thracian king Rhecuporis in paragraphs 4.9.79 of his Epistulae ex Ponto to C. Pomponius Grecinus and 4.16.15 wrriten to "an envious man".

The Greek geographer Ptolemy also mentions Troesmis in Book 3, Chapter 10 of his work Geographia as a station of the Roman Legion Legio V Macedonica.

The Itinerarium Antonini mentions it as well, locating it between Beroe Piatra Frecăței and Arrubium (at sq/m distance from the first and at 9 sq/m from the second) and attests the presence of the Roman Legion Legio I Iovia.

It is also mentioned in the Tabula Peutingeriana at 8.3: Troesmis (at 23 sq/m from Beroe and at 8 sq/m from Arrubium).

The Itinerarium Burdigalense also mentions it, as do the Ravenna Cosmography, Hierocles and the Byzantine Emperor Constantine VII.

References

Former populated places in Eastern Europe
Moesia
Roman legionary fortresses in Romania
History of Dobruja
Historic monuments in Tulcea County